Piedras Blancas (literally, "White Stones") is a fairly common place name in the Spanish-speaking world. It may refer to:
 Piedras Blancas, a town in Asturias, Spain 
 Piedras Blancas, Montevideo, a neighbourhood in Montevideo, Uruguay
 Piedras Blancas National Park in Costa Rica
 Piedras Blancas, Aguada, Puerto Rico, a barrio
 Piedras Blancas, San Sebastián, Puerto Rico, a barrio
 Pico Piedras Blancas, a mountain peak in Venezuela
 Piedras Blancas Light Station, Piedras Blancas Point, California
 Piedras Blancas State Marine Reserve and Marine Conservation Area in California

See also
Piedra Blanca,  a town in the Dominican Republic
 Piedras Negras (disambiguation)